Hassan Yousuf (Arabic:حسن يوسف) (born 29 January 1992) is an Emirati footballer. He currently plays as a winger for Emirates.

Career

Al-Wasl
Hassan Yousuf started his career at Al-Wasl and is a product of the Al-Wasl's youth system. On 24 April 2011, Hassan Yousuf made his professional debut for Al-Wasl against Ittihad Kalba in the Pro League, replacing Alexandre Oliveira.

Al-Fujairah
On 8 August 2014, left Al-Wasl and signed with Al-Fujairah. On 15 September 2014, Hassan Yousuf made his professional debut for Al-Fujairah against Emirates Club in the Pro League .

Al Urooba
On Season 2016, left Al-Fujairah and signed with Al Urooba.

Ittihad Kalba
On 27 May 2018, left Al Urooba and signed with Ittihad Kalba. On 14 August 2018, Hassan Yousuf made his professional debut for Ittihad Kalba against Emirates Club in the Pro League.

References

External links
 

1992 births
Living people
Emirati footballers
Al-Wasl F.C. players
Fujairah FC players
Al Urooba Club players
Al-Ittihad Kalba SC players
Emirates Club players
UAE Pro League players
UAE First Division League players
Association football wingers
Place of birth missing (living people)